Millet is a cereal grain. 

Millet may also refer to:

Places
 Millet, Alberta, Canada
 Millet, a fictional town close to Lake Wobegon
 Millet, an unincorporated community southwest of Lansing, MI
 Millet, Saint Lucia, a town in Anse la Raye Quarter

Other uses
 Millet (surname)
 Millet (Ottoman Empire), an Ottoman religious community
 Millets, UK retailer of leisure goods owned by Blacks Outdoor Retail
 Millet (manufacturer), French maker of sporting goods
 Millet (TV channel), a pro-Russian television channel

See also
Millett (disambiguation)